Witham St Hughs  is a housing estate in the Parish of Thurlby in the North Kesteven district of Lincolnshire, England. The population of the civil parish (including Thurlby) was 2,356 at the 2011 census.

Witham St Hughs has a primary school and community hall.

Businesses in Witham St Hughs include UK Mail, Limagrain, Germinal and Cargill. Frontier Agriculture, the UK's largest grain marketing business has its head office in Witham St Hughs.

There is a nursery in the precinct, a Co-op, a beauty & hair salon and two takeaway restaurants. There are infrequent bus services to Lincoln and Newark.

References

External links

Villages in Lincolnshire
Civil parishes in Lincolnshire
North Kesteven District